Anton Eshon Hairston (born April 21, 1980), who goes by the stage name Eshon Burgundy, is an American former Christian hip hop musician.

His first album, Blood Rushing to My Head, was released in 2012 with Salvation Armie Music Group. He released his second album, 2015's The Fear of God, with Humble Beast Records.

Early life
Eshon Burgundy was born Anton Eshon Hairston in Abington, Pennsylvania, He was raised by his mother Rochelle in Philadelphia, Pennsylvania. He was raised in an environment of constantly moving from residence-to-residence across Philadelphia after his mother was in an abusive relationship with a boyfriend at the time. They eventually settled in a housing complex, Passyunk Homes. This would lead him to become the responsible oldest sibling in his family, where he has two younger brothers, Seifuddin and Ameer, and a younger sister, Aleema. Eshon was shot three times when he was 15 years old, coming within minutes of dying. This was the impetus for him to dedicate the next five years of his life to being involved in the hip hop underground community in his hometown of Philadelphia. He later signed two record deals with drug kingpins around 2000 but never released any music. He became a Christian in 2001 and began making Christian hip hop music in his hometown, until he relocated to Jacksonville, Florida.

Music career
His professional music career began in 2007, when he was featured along with poet Black Ice on Dj Jazzy Jeff's Return Of The Magnificent album. The song was entitled Run that back. Eshon Burgundy released his debut album Blood Rushing to My Head with Salvation Armie Music Group on July 24, 2012.

His second album, The Fear of God, was released by Humble Beast Records on March 3, 2015, just shy of his thirty-fifth birthday. This was his Billboard chart breakthrough album, with it charting at No. 15 on the Christian Albums, No. 20 on the Rap Albums, No. 25 on the Independent Albums, and on the Heatseekers Albums at No. 4.

On May 27, 2016, Eshon Burgundy released his highly anticipated third album called The Passover. The album was inspired by the Passover of the Exodus of the Israelites out of Egypt. He then released a fourth and most recent album which he named For The Love of Money on September 20, 2019.

Beginning in late 2020, Burgundy began to refer to himself as a Hebrew, the idea that he—as a descendant of Black American slaves—is a true Hebrew Israelite. As such, he has begun to distance himself from mainstream Christianity and the larger Evangelical community.

Personal life
Eshon Burgundy has a wife, Zara, and they have three children. Harlem, Evyr and Kinsington.

Discography

References

External links
 Official website
 Wade-O Radio interview

Living people
African-American male rappers
African-American Christians
Singers from Texas
Musicians from Jacksonville, Florida
People from Fort Worth, Texas
American performers of Christian hip hop music
Rappers from Texas
Rappers from Florida
Rappers from Philadelphia
Rappers from Atlanta
Songwriters from Florida
Songwriters from Pennsylvania
Songwriters from Texas
Songwriters from Georgia (U.S. state)
21st-century American rappers
21st-century American male musicians
Year of birth missing (living people)
African-American songwriters
21st-century African-American musicians
American male songwriters